The 2022 Kosovar Supercup was the 31st edition of the Kosovar Supercup, an annual football match played between the winners of the previous season's Kosovo Superleague and Kosovar Cup competitions. The match was played between Ballkani, champions of the 2021–22 Kosovo Superleague and Llapi, who beat their opponents to win the 2021–22 Kosovar Cup Final.

Ballkani won the match 1–0 and claimed their first Supercup title.

Match

Details

See also
2021–22 Football Superleague of Kosovo
2021–22 Kosovar Cup

References

Kosovar Supercup
Supercup
International club association football competitions hosted by Turkey